Tatyana Yakovlevna Elizarenkova (September 17, 1929, Saint Petersburg - September 5, 2007, Moscow) was a distinguished Soviet Russian Indologist and linguist, known for her study of the Vedas.

She was described by Wendy Doniger as "the greatest living scholar of the RigVeda, and certainly the greatest linguist of the RigVeda". In 1972 she published a translation of selected Rigvedic hymns into Russian, which eventually evolved into a complete translation of Rigveda in the following decades, published by Nauka 1989-1999 (3 volumes). Her complete Russian translation of Atharvaveda was published in 2005-2010 (3 volumes).

In 1976, together with her husband Vladimir Nikolayevich Toporov, she published in English a linguistic analysis of Pali: The Pali Language. She was also an expert on Hindi, and published numerous works on its grammar.

Elizarenkova and Toporov were also the chief driving forces of Tartu-Moscow Semiotic School.

India had honored her with the Padma Shri in 2004 for her contributions in the study of Vedas.

Publications
 Aorist v "Rigvede", 1950
 I︠A︡zyk pali, 1965
 Issledovanii︠a︡ po diakhronicheskoĭ fonologii indoariĭskikh i︠a︡zykov, 1974
 The Pāli language, 1976
 Grammatika vediĭskogo i︠a︡zyka, 1982
 Vediĭskiĭ i︠a︡zyk, 1987
 Language and style of the Vedic R̥ṣis, 1993
 Words and things in the R̥gveda, 1995

Notes

References
 

1929 births
2007 deaths
Linguists from Russia
Russian Indologists
Moscow State University alumni
Recipients of the Padma Shri in literature & education
Women linguists
20th-century linguists